Maroni is a surname and a masculine given name. People with the surname include:

People

Surname
 Gonzalo Maroni (born 1999), Argentine football player
 James Maroni (1873–1957), Norwegian theologian and priest 
 Pablo Maroni (born 1695), Jesuit missionary to the Viceroyalty of Peru
 Roberto Maroni (1955–2022), Italian politician
 Rodrigo Maroni (born 1981), Brazilian politician

Given name
 Maroni Kumazawa (1895–1958), Japanese photographer

Fictional characters
 Sal Maroni, Gotham character

See also
Maroni, disambiguation page

Surnames of Italian origin
Masculine given names